Richard Angelo (born August 29, 1962) is an American serial killer who operated within Long Island and West Islip, New York. In 1989, he was convicted of murdering several of his patients and sentenced to 61 years to life in prison.

Early life
Angelo was born on August 29, 1962, to parents who were both working in education. His mother was an economics teacher, and his father was a high school guidance counselor for the Lindenhurst school district on Long Island. He graduated from St. John the Baptist Diocesan High School in 1980 and then entered a two-year nursing program at Farmingdale State College, where he was a well-regarded honor student.

Arrest

Angelo first came to the attention of the public in October 1987 when he was suspected of poisoning a patient at then Good Samaritan Medical Center. He was accused of injecting Gerolamo Cucich with Pavulon via his I.V. The patient felt unwell after the injection, and later paged a nurse to help him. Angelo was arrested for assault on the 73-year-old patient because he was the only person to match the description given to the police.

Following his arrest, Angelo confessed to having poisoned other patients with Pavulon and Anectine. As a result, as many as 30 recently deceased patients were exhumed and examined for traces of these powerful paralyzing agents.

It was later concluded that he had poisoned at least 35 people at the hospital while working there for seven months. The poisoning resulted in ten deaths. He claimed that his motive was to portray himself as a hero. After poisoning his victims, he would wait until they went into cardiac arrest and then come by and save them in front of his colleagues. He was held in Suffolk County Jail for more than a year, awaiting trial. He declined to pay his $50,000 bail, fearing for his safety given the high-profile nature of the case.

Conviction

In December 1989, Angelo was found guilty on two counts of murder, one count of manslaughter, and one count of criminally negligent homicide. He was also convicted of assault in connection with the deaths of four other patients, and he was suspected of being responsible for several other deaths.

On January 25, 1990, he was sentenced to 50-years-to-life in prison. He was 27 years old. He is serving a life sentence at the Great Meadow Correctional Facility  and will become eligible for parole in 2049, when he is 87.

See also 
 List of serial killers in the United States
 List of medical and pseudo-medical serial killers

References

External links 
 New York State - Department of Corrections and Community Supervision >Inmate Lookup Richard Angelo - Department Identification Number (DIN): 90A2242  

1962 births
20th-century American criminals
American male criminals
American nurses
American people convicted of assault
American people convicted of manslaughter
American people convicted of murder
American prisoners sentenced to life imprisonment
American serial killers
Criminals from New York City
Living people
Male nurses
Male serial killers
Medical serial killers
Nurses convicted of killing patients
People convicted of murder by New York (state)
Poisoners
Prisoners sentenced to life imprisonment by New York (state)
St. John the Baptist Diocesan High School alumni